The communauté de communes en Terres Vives was located in the Cher  département  of the Centre-Val de Loire  region of France. It was created on 15 June 1994. It was merged into the new Communauté de communes Terres du Haut Berry in January 2017.

Member communes 
It comprised the following 11 communes:

Allogny 
Fussy 
Menetou-Salon 
Pigny 
Quantilly
Saint-Éloy-de-Gy 
Saint-Georges-sur-Moulon 
Saint-Martin-d'Auxigny 
Saint-Palais 
Vasselay
Vignoux-sous-les-Aix

References 

Terres Vives